"American Woman" is a song by Canadian rock band the Guess Who, released January 1970, from the album of the same name. It was later released in March 1970 as a single backed with "No Sugar Tonight", and it reached number one for three weeks commencing May 9 on both the United States' Billboard Hot 100 and the Canadian RPM magazine singles chart. Billboard magazine placed the single at number three on the Year-End Hot 100 singles of 1970 list, and it was listed as number five for 1970 on the RPM Year-End Chart. On May 22, 1970, the single was certified as gold by the Recording Industry Association of America (RIAA).  It also reached the top ten in the Netherlands, Switzerland and Austria, and the top twenty in the United Kingdom and New Zealand.

Produced by Jack Richardson, the single was recorded on August 13, 1969, at RCA's Mid-America Recording Center in Chicago.

Writing and lyrics
The music and lyrics of the song were improvised on stage during a concert in Southern Ontario (the guitarist, Randy Bachman, recalled it being at a concert in Kitchener, although Burton Cummings, the lead singer, said it was at the Broom and Stone, a curling rink in Scarborough). Bachman was playing notes while tuning his guitar after replacing a broken string, and he realized he was playing a new riff that he wanted to remember. He continued playing it and the other band members returned to the stage and joined in, creating a jam session in which Cummings improvised the lyrics. They noticed a kid with a cassette recorder making a bootleg recording and asked him for the tape. They listened to the tape and noted down the words that Cummings had extemporized, and which he later revised.

The song's lyrics have been the matter of debate, often interpreted as an attack on U.S. politics (especially the draft). Cummings,  who composed the lyrics, said in 2013 that they had nothing to do with politics. "What was on my mind was that girls in the States seemed to get older quicker than our girls and that made them, well, dangerous. When I said 'American woman, stay away from me,' I really meant 'Canadian woman, I prefer you.' It was all a happy accident."

Jim Kale, the group's bassist, explained his take on the lyrics:

The popular misconception was that it was a chauvinistic tune, which was anything but the case. The fact was, we came from a very strait-laced, conservative, laid-back country, and all of a sudden, there we were in Chicago, Detroit, New York – all these horrendously large places with their big city problems. After that one particularly grinding tour, it was just a real treat to go home and see the girls we had grown up with. Also, the war was going on, and that was terribly unpopular. We didn't have a draft system in Canada, and we were grateful for that. A lot of people called it anti-American, but it wasn't really. We weren't anti-anything. John Lennon once said that the meanings of all songs come after they are recorded. Someone else has to interpret them.

Bachman expressed the view in 2014 that it was "an anti-war protest song", explaining that when they came up with it on stage, the band and the audience had a problem with the Vietnam War. Said Bachman: "We had been touring the States. This was the late '60s, one time at the US/Canada border in North Dakota they tried to draft us and send us to Vietnam. We were back in Canada, playing in the safety of Canada where the dance is full of draft dodgers who've all left the States".

The Guess Who were invited to play at the White House on July 17, 1970, shortly after the song's release. Because of its perceived anti-American lyrics, Pat Nixon, the wife of President Richard Nixon, asked that they not play "American Woman".

Personnel
Burton Cummings – vocals
Randy Bachman – lead and rhythm guitar
Jim Kale – bass
Garry Peterson – drums

While most of the band's charting songs during this period were credited to just Bachman or Cummings or the two of them, this piece was credited to all four members of the band, in keeping with the way they all first improvised it together on stage. This full-band writing credit happened only one other time for the Guess Who, with their 1973 top 20 Canadian hit "Follow Your Daughter Home", albeit with a different line-up at that time.

Chart performance

Weekly charts

Year-end charts

Lenny Kravitz version

American singer-songwriter Lenny Kravitz covered "American Woman" for the soundtrack of Austin Powers: The Spy Who Shagged Me. It was released as a single in May 1999 and was later included on the reissue of Kravitz's album 5. Kravitz's version is slower and softer than the original, without the signature guitar solo; he later said to Randy Bachman that the reason why he skipped the lead guitar part was "I couldn't get the sound. I couldn't get the tone."

The cover reached the top 20 in Australia, Finland, Iceland, New Zealand, and Spain, as well as number 26 in Canada and number 49 on the US Billboard Hot 100. The music video (directed by Paul Hunter) featured actress Heather Graham (who starred in The Spy Who Shagged Me); the original political themes of the song were largely replaced by sex appeal. In 1999, the Guess Who joined Kravitz and his band for a live performance of "American Woman" at the MuchMusic Video Awards.

Awards

|-
| 2000
| 42nd Annual Grammy Awards
| Best Male Rock Vocal Performance
| 
|}

Track listings
US 7-inch jukebox vinyl
A. "American Woman"
B. "Fly Away"

UK and European CD single
 "American Woman" (single version) – 3:50
 "Fields of Joy" (live) – 4:20

Australasian CD EP
 "American Woman" (single version) – 3:50
 "Straight Cold Player" (live) – 3:42
 "Thinking of You" (Hexum Dancehall remix) – 5:58
 "Fields of Joy" (live) – 4:20

Charts

Weekly charts

Year-end charts

Certifications and sales

Release history

Other cover versions
"American Woman" has been covered by a number of artists. In 1982, Swiss hard rock band Krokus included a cover on their album One Vice at a Time. Butthole Surfers released a cover version on a bonus 5" vinyl single included with their 1985 home video release Blind Eye Sees All.  The 2002 DVD reissue uses the same version as background music for the bonus photo gallery.  They also made a drum-heavy experimental remix version of this recording, which appeared on their 1986 album Rembrandt Pussyhorse. Anal Cunt recorded a grindcore version for their 1995 album Top 40 Hits.

Use in film
It was featured in Sam Mendes's film American Beauty, performed by main character Lester Burnham (played by Kevin Spacey).  Sam the Eagle performed a karaoke version of this song in a Muppets viral video, until he stops in protest of its lyrics, and finds that it is a Canadian song even more upsetting.  It was used in the HBO trailer for the film Game Change. A version sung by an older man was used in the film The Cable Guy (1996). It was heard during the ending credits of the Witchblade TV film (2000), starring Yancy Butler and based on the Top Cow comic book series. American Woman was featured in the second instalment of the Austin Powers film trilogy, The Spy Who Shagged Me, with Heather Graham dancing provocatively whilst it played. The song was featured in an episode of "Due South"s first season (Diefenbaker's Day Off S01 E02). Kelly Clarkson recorded a cover version of the song as a theme song from the Paramount Network TV series, American Woman.

See also
 List of anti-war songs

References

External links

1969 singles
1969 songs
1970 singles
1999 singles
Anti-war songs
Billboard Hot 100 number-one singles
Cashbox number-one singles
Grammy Award for Best Male Rock Vocal Performance
The Guess Who songs
Lenny Kravitz songs
Music videos directed by Paul Hunter (director)
Protest songs
RCA Victor singles
RPM Top Singles number-one singles
Song recordings produced by Jack Richardson (record producer)
Song recordings produced by Lenny Kravitz
Songs written by Burton Cummings
Songs written by Jim Kale
Songs written by Randy Bachman
Songs of the Vietnam War
Virgin Records singles